Tryggvi Snær Hlinason (born 28 October 1997) is an Icelandic professional basketball for Basket Zaragoza of the Liga ACB. He began his career in his home country, competing with Þór Akureyri. Tryggvi is a regular member of the Icelandic national team, with experience at EuroBasket.

Early life
In a 2017 ESPN story, Jón Arnór Stefánsson, one of the country's greatest players, said about the area where Tryggvi was raised, "It's a situation you can't explain to a person that doesn't live in Iceland or that part of the country. When the weather is harsh, you can't really get to or from it, so you're just stuck up there. It's a unique story, man." Tryggvi himself would say in a 2018 interview with Yahoo Sports, "There was always work to do on the farm, but the freedom you have is insane. It's so far to the next house that you can do whatever you like and nobody really cares." One of his youth basketball coaches, Águst Guðmundsson, added that during winter, driving to and from the farm was sometimes impossible for two weeks or more at a time, even with four-wheel drive vehicles. During such conditions, the only access to the farm is by snowmobile.

In 2013, his parents decided to send him to secondary school in Akureyri, the main town of northern Iceland. The country has no basketball program in its secondary schools; his parents planned to have him learn as much as he could, especially in the electrical field, in order for him to help improve their farm operations. Shortly after his arrival in Akureyri, he called Bjarki Ármann Oddsson, then head coach of the under-17 team of Icelandic league club Þór Akureyri, wishing to give basketball a try—even though he owned no basketball shoes, and had never seen live full-court basketball. The coaches at Þór, plus Einar Jóhannsson, head coach of the Iceland U-18 national team, convinced Tryggvi's parents that he had a future in the sport.

Professional career

Þór Akureyri (2014–2017)
Tryggvi signed with Division I club Þór Akureyri in 2014. He played sparingly during the first half of the season but averaged 10.8 points, 7.5 rebounds and 5.1 blocks in the final 8 games. In his second season, he averaged 12.8 points, 9.0 rebounds and 3.5 blocks and helped Þór Akureyri win Division I and achieve promotion to the Úrvalsdeild, the top tier league in Iceland. After the season he was named to the Division I Domestic All-first team and as the D1 Young Player of the Year. Throughout his third and final season with Þór Akureyri, he led the Úrvalsdeild in blocked shots.

Valencia Basket (2017–2019)
In June 2017, Tryggvi signed with reigning Liga ACB champions, Valencia Basket. On 23 September 2017 he won the Spanish Supercup with Valencia. In December 2017 it was revealed that he finish second in voting for the Icelandic Men's Basketball Player of the Year award, after Martin Hermannsson. Throughout his first season with Valencia, Tryggvi would split his playing time between Valencia and their Liga EBA affiliate squad where he averaged 11.7 points and 9.8 rebounds. In June 2019, Valencia released Tryggvi from his contract.

NBA
On 16 April 2018 Tryggvi declared for the 2018 NBA draft, for which ESPN considered him a potential second-round pick. He was one of only 11 truly international players to declare for that year's draft early. He would ultimately go undrafted. He played for the Toronto Raptors during the 2018 NBA Summer League in Las Vegas, appearing in two games for them.

Loan to Obradoiro CAB (2018–2019)
Tryggvi spent the 2016–17 on a loan to Obradoiro where he averaged 3.5 points and 2.4 rebounds per game in 33 games in the Liga ACB.

Basket Zaragoza (2019–present)
On 9 July 2019 Tryggvi signed a three-year deal with Spanish club Zaragoza. He led the Liga ACB in 2 point field goal percent over the 2020–21 season, making 75,2% of his shots.

Icelandic national team
Tryggvi was selected to the Icelandic men's national team in 2016 and helped Iceland qualify for FIBA EuroBasket 2017, which was their second appearance in the nation's history. He was also member of the Icelandic U20 national team that competed in the 2017 FIBA Europe Under-20 Championship, where he was named member of the All-Tournament Team. He led the tournament in blocks and efficiency, while coming in third in rebounds and seventh in scoring. Tryggvi became only the third 7-footer in the 21st century to average at least 14 points, 3 blocks, and 2 assists per 40 minutes at the European U-20s, after former NBA player Andris Biedriņš and 2017 NBA draft pick Anžejs Pasečņiks.

Einar commented on Tryggvi's development in the aforementioned ESPN piece: "In 40 months he goes from a kid in a farm who liked sports but never played basketball into being signed by Valencia. Amazing."

On 23 February 2020, Tryggvi had 26 points, 17 rebounds and 8 blocks in a victory against Slovakia in the 2023 FIBA Basketball World Cup pre-qualification. On 25 February 2022, Tryggvi had 34 points, 21 rebounds and 5 blocked shots in a double overtime victory against Italy in the 2023 FIBA Basketball World Cup qualification.

Honours

Spain

Club
Spanish Supercup winner (2017)

Iceland

Club
Icelandic Division I champion: 2016

Individual
Liga ACB two point field goal percent leader: 2021
Úrvalsdeild karla blocks leader: 2017
Icelandic Division I blocks leader: 2015, 2016
Icelandic Division I Domestic All-first team: 2016
Icelandic Division I Young Player of the Year: 2016

International
FIBA Europe U20 Championship All-Tournament Team: 2017

References

External links
Euroleague profile
Úrvalsdeild profile
Eurobasket 2017 profile
2017 FIBA U20 European Championship profile

1997 births
Living people
Basket Zaragoza players
Centers (basketball)
Tryggvi Hlinason
Icelandic expatriate basketball people in the United States
Tryggvi Hlinason
Liga ACB players
Tryggvi Hlinason
Tryggvi Hlinason
Valencia Basket players